Chrysochernes elegans is a species of pseudoscorpion in the subfamily Chernetinae. It is found in New Mexico, United States.

References

External links 

 Chrysochernes elegans at insectoid.info

Animals described in 1956
Chernetidae
Arthropods of the United States
Biota of New Mexico